"Ghaint Patola" is a song by the bhangra-rap group Offlicence produced by a new up and coming Asian producer named J-Ice. The single was released on iTunes on April 21, 2011. The song debuted at #2 on the Official Top 40 Asian Download Chart on May 7, 2011.

Music video
The video was directed by Djonny Chen and produced by Richard Wood. It premiered on April 14, 2011 on Brit Asia TV. Emma Singh plays the leading lady with Panjabi MC making a cameo appearance in the video.

Remixes
The official remix to "Ghaint Patola" was first played on BBC Radio 1 by DJ Nihal on June 8, 2011.
A remix by DJ Shadow Dubai and Plus91 was released on iTunes on June 9, 2011.

Chart position

References

2011 singles
2011 songs